Marco Marinangeli is a Grammy-nominated Italian composer, songwriter, arranger, orchestrator and producer. He is the president of Magelic Productions, Inc., in Hollywood. He is a writer and producer of Josh Groban, Donna Summer, Plácido Domingo, The Tenors, The Cheetah Girls, China Anne McClain, Dove Cameron, Lucas Grabeel, Monique Coleman, Peter Frampton, Taylor Dayne, Kathie Lee Gifford, Myra, Olga Tañon, Miley Cyrus aka Hannah Montana, Hilary Duff, Solas, The Chieftains, Larry Carlton and George Perris. He has collaborated with David Foster, Humberto Gatica, William Ross (composer), Jeremy Lubbock, Luis Bacalov, Jorge Calandrelli and Lalo Schifrin.

External links
 Marco Marinangeli's Info Website
 [ Marco Marinangeli's work at AllMusic.com]

Italian composers
Italian male composers
Italian songwriters
Male songwriters
Living people
Place of birth missing (living people)
Year of birth missing (living people)
Italian record producers